Gabriela Wolf (born 28 October 1960) is a German long-distance runner. She competed in the women's marathon at the 1988 Summer Olympics representing West Germany.

References

1960 births
Living people
Athletes (track and field) at the 1988 Summer Olympics
German female long-distance runners
German female marathon runners
Olympic athletes of West Germany
Place of birth missing (living people)
20th-century German women
21st-century German women